In literary theory and aesthetics, authorial intent refers to an author's intent as it is encoded in their work. Authorial intentionalism is the view that an author's intentions should constrain the ways in which a text is properly interpreted. Opponents, who undermined its hermeneutical importance, have labelled this position the intentional fallacy and count it among the informal fallacies.

Varying attitudes towards intentionalism in literary theory

New Criticism

New Criticism, as espoused by Cleanth Brooks, W. K. Wimsatt, T. S. Eliot, and others, argued that authorial intent is irrelevant to understanding a work of literature. Wimsatt and Monroe Beardsley argue in their essay "The Intentional Fallacy" that "the design or intention of the author is neither available nor desirable as a standard for judging the success of a work of literary art". The author, they argue, cannot be reconstructed from a writing—the text is the primary source of meaning, and any details of the author's desires or life are secondary. Wimsatt and Beardsley argue that even details about the work's composition or the author's intended meaning and purpose that might be found in other documents such as journals or letters are "private or idiosyncratic; not a part of the work as a linguistic fact" and are thus secondary to the trained reader's rigorous engagement with the text itself.

Wimsatt and Beardsley divide the evidence used in making interpretations of poetry (although their analysis can be applied equally well to any type of art) into three categories:

 Internal (or public) evidence Internal evidence refers to what is presented within a given work. This internal evidence includes strong familiarity with the conventions of language and literature: it "is discovered through the semantics and syntax of a poem, through our habitual knowledge of the language, through grammars, dictionaries, and all the literature which is the source of dictionaries, in general through all that makes a language and culture". Analyzing a work of art based on internal evidence will not result in the intentional fallacy.
   
 External (or private) evidence What is not literally contained in the work itself is external to that work, including all private or public statements that the artist has made about the work of art, whether in conversations, letters, journals, or other sources. Evidence of this type is directly concerned with what the artist may have intended to do even or especially when it is not apparent from the work itself. Analyzing a work of art based on external evidence will likely result in the intentional fallacy.

 Intermediate evidence  The third type of evidence, intermediate evidence, includes "private or semiprivate meanings attached to words or topics by an author or by a coterie of which he is a member." Also included are "the history of words" and "the biography of an author, his use of a word, and the associations which the word had for him." Wimsatt and Beardsley argue for the use of intermediate evidence rather than external evidence in the interpretation of a literary work, but they recognize that these two types of evidence "shade into one another so subtly that it is not always easy to draw a line between" the two.

Thus, a text's internal evidence—the words themselves and their meanings—is open for literary analysis. External evidence—anything not contained within the text itself, such as statements made by the poet about the poem that is being interpreted—does not belong to literary criticism. Preoccupation with the authorial intent "leads away from the poem." According to Wimsatt and Beardsley, a poem does not belong to its author but rather "is detached from the author at birth and goes about the world beyond his power to intend about it or control it. The poem belongs to the public."

Psychoanalytic criticism

In psychoanalytic criticism, the author's biography and unconscious state were seen as part of the text, and therefore the author's intent could be revived from a literary text—although the intent might be an unconscious one. There are critics who maintain that this unconscious characteristic reinforces the idea that the text is autonomous due to its profound ambiguity as well as the unresolved contradictions. These supposedly underscore two implications: 1. the reader is forced to invent his own interpretation; 2. the author himself is not in conscious control. Critics who do not subscribe to the psychoanalytic approach to authorial intent include Leo Strauss, who argued that the answer to the question of intent can only be obtained from the literary text itself.

Cambridge School contextualism

The Cambridge School of contextualist hermeneutics, a position most elaborated by Quentin Skinner, in the first instances distinguishes linguistic meaning from speech-acts: that is to say, things which the performance of an utterance does. Consider the following. Typically, the ceremony of marriage concludes upon the exchange of the utterance "I do". In such a case, to utter "I do" is not merely to report an internal disposition, but to perform an action, namely, to get married. The intended force of "I do" in such a circumstance is only ever retrievable through understanding something about the complex social activity of marriage. Indeed, to understand a speech-act is to understand what conventions are regulating its significance. Since actions are always publicly legible—they are done by the speech itself—this presupposes no knowledge about the author's mental states. The task is always thus: with as much contextual information as possible, can we establish which conventions a text was interacting with, and by inference to the best explanation, what the author's intent was?

Post-structuralism

In post-structuralism, there are a variety of approaches to authorial intent. For some of the theorists deriving from Jacques Lacan, and in particular theories variously called écriture féminine, gender and sex predetermine the ways that texts will emerge, and the language of textuality itself will present an argument that is potentially counter to the author's conscious intent. There is also the case of E.D. Hirsch, who maintained the importance of the connection between meaning and authorial intent. In this theory, he opposed the position of structuralists who maintained that language itself conveys meaning that is indepedent of human agency.

Marxist criticism

For Marxist literary theorists, the author's intent is always a code for a particular set of ideologies in the author's own day.  For Marxists (especially those of the Soviet realism type), authorial intent is manifest in the text and must be placed in a context of liberation and the materialist dialectic.  However, Marxist-derived theorists have seen authorial intent in a much more nuanced way.  Raymond Williams, for example, posits literary productions always exist within a context of emerging, resistant, and synthetic ideological positions.  The author's intent is recoverable from the text, but there are always encoded within it several separate positions.  The author might be arguing consciously for empire, but hidden within that argument will be a response to a counterargument and a presentation of an emerging synthesis.  Some members of the reception theory group (Hans Robert Jauss, in particular) have approximated the Marxist view by arguing that the forces of cultural reception reveal the ideological positions of both author and readership.

Reader response

Reader response critics denies the stability and accessibility of meaning as well as the ideological approaches to literary texts that forces lenses for understanding them. These critics view the authorial intent variously.  In general, they have argued that the author's intent itself is immaterial and cannot be fully recovered.  However, the author's intent will shape the text and limit the possible interpretations of a work.  The reader's impression of the author's intent is a working force in interpretation, but the author's actual intent is not. Some critics in this school believe that reader response is a transaction and that there is some form of negotiation going on between authorial intent and reader’s response. According to Michael Smith and Peter Rabinowitz, this approach is not simply about the question “What does this mean to me?” because if that was the case, the power of the text to transform is given up.

Weak intentionalism
Weak intentionalism combines intentionalism with insights from reader response. Mark Bevir  in The Logic of the History of Ideas sees meanings as necessarily intentional but suggests that the relevant intentions can be those of readers as well as those of authors. Weak intentionalists privilege intentionality to emphasize that texts do not have meanings in themselves. They believe that meanings are always meanings for people—albeit the relevant people, whether authors or readers.

Extreme Intentionalism
In her book Only Imagine: Fiction, Interpretation, and Imagination (2017), Kathleen Stock argues for an "extreme" focus on authorial intent in fictional texts. She proposes that an author's text has a certain fictional content if and only if the author intends that the reader imagines the fictional content. The reader has to recognize the intention and use it in the imagining process.

In textual criticism
Authorial intention is of great practical concern to some textual critics. These are known as intentionalists and are identified with the Bowers-Tanselle school of thought. Their editions have as one of their most important goals the recovery of the author's intentions (generally final intentions). When preparing a work for the press, an editor working along the principles outlined by Fredson Bowers and G. Thomas Tanselle will attempt to construct a text that is close to the author's final intentions. For transcription and typesetting, authorial intentionality can be considered paramount.

An intentionalist editor would constantly investigate the documents for traces of authorial intention. On one hand, it can be argued that the author always intends whatever the author writes and that at different points in time the same author might have very different intentions. On the other hand, an author may in some cases write something he or she did not intend. For example, an intentionalist would consider for emendation the following cases:

The authorial manuscript misspells a word: an error in intention, it is usually assumed. Editorial procedures for works available in no 'authorized editions' (and even those are not always exempt) often specify correcting such errors.
The authorial manuscript presents what appears to be a misformat of the text: a sentence has been left in run-on form. It is assumed that the author might have regretted not beginning a new paragraph, but did not see this problem until afterwards, until rereading.
The authorial manuscript presents a factual error.

In cases such as these where the author is living, they would be questioned by the editor who would then adhere to the intention expressed. In cases where the author is deceased, an intentionalist would attempt to approach authorial intention. The strongest voices countering an emphasis on authorial intent in scholarly editing have been D. F. McKenzie and Jerome McGann, proponents of a model that accounts for the "social text," tracing material transformations and embodiments of works while not privileging one version over another.

See also
Tendenz
 Paul de Man
Canonical criticism

Notes

Further reading
 William J. Abraham (1988). "Intentions and the Logic of Interpretation," The Ashbury Theological Journal 43.1: 11-25. 
 
 
 Dowling, William C. "The Gender Fallacy", in Theory's Empire: An Anthology of Dissent. Ed. Daphne Patai and Will Corral. New York: Columbia University Press, 2005.
 
 
 

Literary criticism
Literary theory
Narratology
Intention
Philosophy of literature